The men's ISSF 50 meter pistol (then called free pistol) was one of the thirteen shooting events at the 1988 Summer Olympics. It was the second Olympic free pistol competition to feature final shooting, after an abortive attempt in 1960. There were 43 competitors from 31 nations. Nations had been limited to two shooters each since the 1952 Games. The event was won by Sorin Babii of Romania, the nation's first victory in the event and first medal in free pistol since 1972. Ragnar Skanåker of Sweden repeated as silver medalist, the second man to earn three medals in the free pistol; four years later, he would become the first to win four medals. Soviet Igor Basinski took bronze.

Background

This was the 17th appearance of the ISSF 50 meter pistol event. The event was held at every Summer Olympics from 1896 to 1920 (except 1904, when no shooting events were held) and from 1936 to 2016; it was nominally open to women from 1968 to 1980, although very few women participated these years. 1896 and 1908 were the only Games in which the distance was not 50 metres; the former used 30 metres and the latter 50 yards.

Four of the top 10 shooters from the 1984 Games returned: gold medalist Xu Haifeng of China, silver medalist (and 1972 gold medalist and 1976 and 1980 top-10 finisher) Ragnar Skanåker of Sweden, bronze medalist Wang Yifu of China, and sixth-place finisher Philippe Cola of France. Also returning after the 1984 boycott were 1976 gold medalist Uwe Potteck of East Germany and 1980 gold medalist Aleksandr Melentyev of the Soviet Union. The reigning (1986) world champion was Sergei Pyzhianov, but he was not on the Soviet team that instead comprised Melentyev and world record holder (and runner-up in the world championship) Igor Basinski.

New Zealand made its debut in the event. Sweden and the United States each made their 15th appearance, tied for most of any nation.

Babii used a Tula TOZ 35.

Competition format

The competition featured two rounds, adding a final to the event. The qualifying round was the same as the previous competitions: each shooter fired 60 shots, in 6 series of 10 shots each, at a distance of 50 metres. The target was round, 50 centimetres in diameter, with 10 scoring rings. Scoring for each shot was up to 10 points, in increments of 1 point. The maximum score possible was 600 points. Now, however, the top 8 shooters advanced to a final. They shot an additional series of 10 shots, with the score added to their qualifying round score to give a 70-shot total. Ties were broken first by final round score. Any pistol was permitted.

Records

Prior to this competition, the existing world and Olympic records were as follows.

Sorin Babii set the initial Olympic record for the final format at 660 points.

Schedule

All times are Korea Standard Time adjusted for daylight savings (UTC+10)

Results

Qualifying

Final

References

Sources

Shooting at the 1988 Summer Olympics
Men's 1988
Men's events at the 1988 Summer Olympics